Janů is a Czech surname derived from the given name Jan. Notable people with the surname include:

 Miroslav Janů (1959–2013), Czech footballer
 Petra Janů, Czech singer and actress
 Tomáš Janů (born 1973), Czech footballer
 Zorka Janů (1921–1946), Czech actress

Czech-language surnames
Patronymic surnames